Bodybuilding competitions at the 2019 Pan American Games in Lima, Peru were held on August 10, 2019 at the Coliseo Mariscal Caceres. The venue also hosted the weightlifting competitions.

In November 2016, Panam Sports added the sport to the Pan American Games sport program, which meant the sport made its debut at the games. A total of two events will be contested: one for men (classic bodybuilding) and one for women (bikini fitness). A total of 32 bodybuilders (16 per gender) competed.

El Salvador won both gold medals on offer.

Medal table

Medalists

Participating nations
A total of 19 countries qualified athletes.

Qualification

A total of 32 athletes qualified. The top 15 athletes (one per nation) after reallocation and the host nation Peru, qualified in each event. Qualification was done at the 2018 Pan American Championships held in Antigua, Guatemala in November.

References

External links
Results book

 
Events at the 2019 Pan American Games
2019
2019 in bodybuilding